Jonas Schützeberg (born 13 June 1984) is a German lightweight rower. He won a gold medal at the 2012 World Rowing Championships in Plovdiv with the lightweight men's eight.

References

1984 births
Living people
German male rowers
World Rowing Championships medalists for Germany